The Bolivian vesper mouse (Calomys boliviae) is a species of rodent in the family Cricetidae. It is found in Argentina, Bolivia and perhaps Peru.

References

Mammals of Bolivia
Calomys
Mammals described in 1901
Taxa named by Oldfield Thomas
Taxonomy articles created by Polbot